Pinus leiophylla, commonly known as Chihuahua pine, smooth-leaf pine, and yellow pine (in Mexico, tlacocote and ocote chino), is a tree with a range primarily in Mexico, with a small extension into the United States in southeast Arizona and southwest New Mexico. The Mexican range extends along the Sierra Madre Occidental and Sierra Madre del Sur from Chihuahua to Oaxaca, from 29° North Lat. to 17°, between 1600 and 3000 meters altitude. It requires about a rainfall 600 to 1000 mm a year, mostly in summer. It tolerates frosts in winter.

Description
The bark is gray-brownish, and fissured.

Subspecies
There are two subspecies (treated by some botanists as distinct species, by others as just varieties):
Pinus leiophylla subsp. leiophylla. Needles slender (0.5–0.9 mm), in fives. It occurs in the southern part of the range, from Oaxaca to Durango, is not frost tolerant, and grows in relatively high rainfall conditions.
Pinus leiophylla subsp. chihuahuana. Needles stouter (0.9–1.3 mm), in threes. It occurs in the northern part of the range, from Durango to Arizona, tolerates frost down to about −10 °C to −15 °C, and very dry conditions. The needle differences are adaptations to these harsher conditions. Synonyms Pinus chihuahuana, Pinus leiophylla var. chihuahuana.

Habitat and ecology
This species often grows in mixed in stands with several other pines and/or junipers, in Arizona most often with Apache Pine and Alligator Juniper, but also grows in pure stands. Its habitat is prone to wildfire, and the species shows some adaptations unusual among pines to cope with this; if the crown is destroyed by fire, the trunk, protected by its thick bark, will send out new shoots to re-grow a new crown. The only other pines to do this are Pitch Pine (P. rigida) and Canary Island Pine (P. canariensis). As none of these are species particularly closely related to each other, the adaptation has probably arisen independently in each, an example of convergent evolution.

Cultivation and uses
The wood of the Pinus leiophylla is hard, dense and strong. It is used for construction, firewood, and railroad ties. In South Africa and Queensland, Australia there are big extensions of this tree planted. It is planted commercially in Kenya, Malawi, Zimbabwe, Zambia at high altitudes.

References

External links

County Distribution in Arizona, from plants.usda.gov
County Distribution in New Mexico, from plants.usda.gov
Interactive Distribution Map of Pinus leiophylla, from plantmaps.com

leiophylla
Trees of Mexico
Trees of Oaxaca
Trees of Puebla
Trees of the Southwestern United States
Trees of Durango
Trees of Chihuahua (state)
Trees of the South-Central United States
Flora of Northeastern Mexico
Plants described in 1831
Trees of temperate climates
Drought-tolerant trees
Least concern plants
Flora of the Sierra Madre Occidental
Flora of the Sierra Madre del Sur
Flora of the Trans-Mexican Volcanic Belt